Ernesto Contreras (born 1969 in Veracruz, Veracruz) is a Mexican film director and screenwriter.

Contreras graduated from the Centro Universitario de Estudios Cinematográficos of the UNAM. His shorts have received several national and international awards, like the Ariel Award of the Mexican Academy for Best Short Film in 2004, for The non-invited.

In 2007, Párpados azules (Blue Eyelids), his first feature-film received the Best Iberoamerican Film and Script awards, as well as the Mezcal Award of the Young Jury in the XXII Guadalajara International Film Festival. He was later nominated for the Camera d’Or of the 60th Cannes Film Festival competing in the official selection of the 46th International Critics' Week. In September of that same year, he received a Special Mention in the San Sebastián International Film Festival, and he also received the National University Distinction Award in Artistic Creation. In 2008, the Sundance Film Festival and the Miami International Film Festival gave him both a Special Jury Prize, and he received the Ariel Award of the Mexican Academy for Best First Work.

In January 2017, Contreras accepted the World Cinema Audience Award: Dramatic at the Sundance Film Festival for his film Sueño en otro idioma.  On November 1, 2017, Contreras began a two-year term as the president of the Mexican Academy of Film Arts and Sciences (Academia Mexicana de Artes y Ciencias Cinematográficas ), also known as AMACC.  His term will end in October 2019.

Paralleling, he produced and coedited the feature documentary The Last Heroes of the Peninsula, by director José Manuel Cravioto, with whom he is currently codirecting a documentary on the Mexican rock band Café Tacvba’s 20th Anniversary.

Filmography
 Blue Eyelids (2007)
 Seguir siendo: Café Tacvba (2010)
 The Obscure Spring (2014)
 I Dream in Another Language (2017)
 Cosas Imposibles (2021)

Short films
 Sueño polaroid (1997)
 Sombras que pasan (1998)
 Ondas hertzianas (2000)
 Gente pequeña (2000)
 El milagro (2000)
 Los no invitados (2003)

Awards

IV Concurso Nacional De Cortometraje - 1998 
 The IV National Contest for Short Films
 El milagro

Guadalajara Film Festival - 1999 
Mayahuel for Best Short Film
 For Ondas hertzianas

Guadalajara Film Festival - 2000 
Mayahuel for Best Short Film
 For El Milagro

Guadalajara International Film Festival - 2007 
Best Iberoamerican Film
Best Iberoamerican Script
Best Mexican Film, by the Young Jury
Best Director, Script, Actor, Actress, and Film, by Press
 For Párpados azules

Alba International Film Festival - 2008 
Premio Subti and Premio Signis - Gazzetta d’Alba

Ariel Award - 2008

Silver Ariel
 Best First Work (Mejor Opera Prima)
 For Párpados azules

Miami International Film Festival - 2008

Special Jury Award
 For Párpados azules

Sundance Film Festival - 2008

Special Jury Prize
 For Párpados azules

Sundance Film Festival - 2017

World Cinema Audience Award: Dramatic
 For Sueño en otro idioma

Nominations

Cannes Film Festival - 2007 
 Camera d'Or 60th
 For Párpados azules

Tokyo International Film Festival - 2007

Grand Prize 
 For Párpados azules

References

External links
Profile at the International Critics' Week site
Profile at the Párpados azules site

1969 births
Ariel Award winners
Mexican film directors
Living people
National Autonomous University of Mexico alumni
People from Veracruz (city)